Jack Ven Tu (1 March 1965 – 30 May 2018) was a Taiwanese-born Canadian cardiologist.

Born in Taipei on 1 March 1965, he graduated from the University of Western Ontario Medical School, then obtained a M.Sc at the University of Toronto. His doctoral dissertation, completed at Harvard University, was titled Quality of Cardiac Surgical Care in Ontario, Canada. Upon earning his Ph.D in 1996, Tu began working for Sunnybrook Health Sciences Centre while teaching at the University of Toronto. He was later named a Tier 1 Canada Research Chair in Health Services Research at the University of Toronto and made a fellow of the Canadian Academy of Health Sciences. Tu died at the age of 53 on 30 May 2018.

Early life and education 
Tu was born in Taipei, Taiwan to parents Jun-bi and Beth. His father was a psychiatrist who took on a position at Queen's University at Kingston upon the family's immigration to Canada when Tu was two. He showed an early interest in the medical sciences and competed in regional and national science fairs as a student. He finished high school in four years instead of five, was accepted to medical school after just one year of undergraduate studies and graduated the youngest of his medical school class in 1988 at the age of 23. He completed his residency in internal medicine at the Toronto General Hospital.

References

1965 births
2018 deaths
Taiwanese emigrants to Canada
Canadian cardiologists
University of Western Ontario alumni
University of Toronto alumni
Academic staff of the University of Toronto
Harvard University alumni
Fellows of the Canadian Academy of Health Sciences
Canada Research Chairs
Scientists from Taipei